Bagoinae is a weevil subfamily in the family Curculionidae. It is sometimes classified in Molytinae.

Genera 
Bagous – Hydronomidius – Hydronoplus – Neoephimeropus – Picia – Pnigodes – Pseudobagous – Sclerolophus

References 

 Alonso-Zarazaga, M.A.; Lyal, C.H.C. 1999: A world catalogue of families and genera of Curculionoidea (Insecta: Coleoptera) (excepting Scolytidae and Platypodidae). Entomopraxis, Barcelona.
 I.Löbl & A.Smetana (eds). 2012 Catalogue of Palearctic Coleoptera. Vol. 8: Curculionoidea II. Apollo Books, Stenstrup, Denmark. p. 172

External links 
 
 

Curculionidae